"Cut to the Feeling" is a song recorded by Canadian singer and songwriter Carly Rae Jepsen, from the Canadian-French animated film Ballerina (2016). It was released as a single on May 26, 2017, to promote the film's release under the title Leap! in the United States. The song was written by Jepsen, Simon Wilcox, and Nolan Lambroza, and produced by Lambroza. The song serves as the theme song for the MTV reality series Siesta Key.

Billboard, The Guardian, Pitchfork, Rolling Stone and Vanity Fair named it one of the best songs of 2017 in their respective year-end lists. Commercially, the single was successful in Japan where it reached the top twenty, peaking at number 13, and was certified gold by the RIAJ.

Background
"Cut to the Feeling" was written during the creation of Jepsen's third studio album, Emotion (2015), but was not included on the album because it was too "cinematic and theatrical". It was later intended for the album's follow-up EP, Emotion: Side B, but was then slated for release with Ballerina after Jepsen signed on for the film and felt the song was fitting for the story. The track was one of two songs, along with "Runaways", that Jepsen contributed to the film. "Cut to the Feeling" was included on the new edition of Emotion: Side B, released exclusively in Japan on September 13, 2017 and re-titled Emotion: Side B+. It was also used as the theme song for the MTV reality television show Siesta Key.

Composition
"Cut to the Feeling" was originally published in the key of A major in common time with a tempo of 115 beats per minute. Jepsen's vocals span from A3 to F#5. The song begins with a sample of the opening synth note from "Lucky Star" by Madonna.

Critical reception
J. Lynch of Billboard called the song "flawlessly constructed", adding it is "the closest we'll get to Whitney Houston's late-'80s dancefloor euphoria in 2017". Hayden Manders of Nylon describes "Cut to the Feeling" as a "masterclass" of the "best, sweetest pop music" today, celebrating the "possibility of big love" with a "chorus that blasts off to stars and doesn't let up for the rest of the song's duration".  She further describes the song as being like the "butterflies you get before a first date with a crush". It was featured as Pitchforks "Best New Track", with Laura Snapes describing it as "bombastic and gaudy" while praising it for being "distinctly Jepsen, her coaxing vocal creakiness convincing her paramour to stop denying what they want and just fucking go for it with her".

Rolling Stone wrote Jepsen "saved 2017 with her bracing rejoinder to Xanax-pop malaise", and that her "boisterous vocal   adds extra urgency to this jump-along anthem's much-needed e•mo•tional rescue". Slant Magazine wrote the single is her best since "Call Me Maybe", adding that it "delivers breathless, syncopated vocals over a measured handclap beat before the whole thing erupts into its euphoric hook." Spin praised the song for deemphasizing Emotions "explicit '80s posing, using that well-worn synth-pop chug for something brighter, bigger, and more bombastic." DJ Louie XIV of Vanity Fair praised Jepsen's directness, as she "cuts straight through the crap...No artifice. No posturing". He described the song as an ecstatic celebration of "diving in headfirst with a new guy (or girl)", providing "the smile we all needed in 2017".

Year-end lists

Music video
The music video for "Cut to the Feeling" was filmed on July 26, 2017, directed by Gia Coppola with whom Jepsen had worked on the "Your Type" video. It begins with behind-the-scenes footage of making this video, which shows the singer and her team getting ready for the shoot. As a clock positioned in the corner counts down from 1 minute and 32 seconds, Jepsen is seen having her make-up applied, posing with her team outdoors, making coffee and playing around the studio. She then arrives at the filming set and the clip launches into the black-and-white performance-style music video, which sees Jepsen's singing the last chorus of the song into a microphone, surrounded by her band. The video premiered on September 15, 2017.

before the official music video, a lyric video for the song was released in June 2017.

Track listings
 Digital download/Streaming
 "Cut to the Feeling" – 3:27

 Digital download/Streaming (Remix)
 "Cut to the Feeling" (Kid Froopy Remix) – 3:13

Charts

Certifications

Release history

References

2017 singles
2017 songs
604 Records singles
Schoolboy Records singles
Interscope Records singles
Carly Rae Jepsen songs
Power pop songs
Songs written by Carly Rae Jepsen
Songs written by Simon Wilcox
Songs written by Sir Nolan
Songs written for animated films